Nina Kiridžija (born September 3, 1992), known as Nina Kiri, is a Serbian Canadian actress, best known for her role as the handmaid Alma in the first five seasons of the Hulu series The Handmaid's Tale (2017–2022).

Life and career
She was born as Nina Kiridžija in Belgrade, Serbia in what was then the Federal Republic of Yugoslavia in 1992, during the Yugoslav Wars. Her family moved to Vancouver, Canada, where she first started performing in school theatre, then professionally on stage starting in 2007.

Kiri's first screen role was a short appearance in the 2011 Disney Channel television movie Geek Charming. In 2016, Kiri teamed up with fellow Serbian-Canadian Sanja Zivkovic, who directed Kiri in the short film Cleo. Kiri had starring roles were in a trio of horror films: Let Her Out (2016), The Haunted House on Kirby Road (2016) and The Heretics (2017). Kiri's performance in The Heretics earned her the Festival Prize for Best Actress at the Buffalo Dreams Fantastic Film Festival.

Kiri gained prominence in 2017 with a recurring role in the television series The Handmaid's Tale. Her character Alma, initially known as Handmaid Ofrobert, first appeared in the opening episode of the series and left the series in the fourth season.

Filmography

Film
Let Her Out (2016)
The Haunted House on Kirby Road (2016)
Super Detention (2016)
The Heretics (2017)
Easy Land (2019)
’’Love in Harmony Valley’’ (2020)

Television
Geek Charming (2011), television movie
The Secret Circle (2012), episode "Witness"
Supernatural (2012), episode "We Need to Talk About Kevin"
The Handmaid's Tale (2017–2022), recurring role, 27 episodes

Awards and nominations

References

External links
 

1992 births
Canadian people of Serbian descent
21st-century Canadian actresses
Canadian film actresses
Living people